Busy beaver is an English language idiom describing of a person who is particularly busy or industrious. Busy beaver and related terms may also refer to:
The Busy Beaver game, in computational theory, a type of Turing machine
Busy Beavers, an online children's educational program
The Busy Beavers, a 1931 Silly Symphonies animated film
Busy Beaver, a True Value co-op member retail store chain

See also
Beaver § Behavior